Scott Donaldson is an American football coach and former player. He is the head football coach at Heidelberg University in Tiffin, Ohio, a position he has held since the 2016 season. Donaldson played college football at Brockport State University in Brockport, New York from 2000 to 2003.

Head coaching record

References

External links
 Heidelberg profile

Year of birth missing (living people)
Living people
American football outside linebackers
Brockport Golden Eagles football players
Heidelberg Student Princes football coaches